Ijiel César Protti (born 31 January 1995) is an Argentine professional footballer who plays as a forward for Tigre.

Career
Protti joined Rosario Central in 2008, before beginning his senior career with the club in June 2015. Protti was selected as a substitute for an Primera División match with Independiente on 7 June, he was subbed on for the last fourteen minutes of a 1–1 draw. That was his sole appearance in 2015, which preceded four appearances in the following campaign of 2016. In August 2016, Protti signed for Talleres of the Primera División on loan. He returned to Rosario Central a year later without featuring in a first-team fixture for Talleres. On 23 August 2017, Protti joined Chacarita Juniors on loan.

Primera B Nacional's Villa Dálmine completed the capture of Protti in July 2018. He scored three goals in his first two league appearances, including a brace on debut versus Instituto. A total of nine goals were netted by Protti for the club across 2018–19. July 2019 saw Protti head across the division to Atlético de Rafaela. He netted seven times for them, the first and last of which were scored against All Boys. In August 2020, Protti signed for Tigre.

Personal life
He is the nephew of former professional footballer Sergio Protti.

Career statistics
.

References

External links

1995 births
Living people
People from Caseros Department
Argentine footballers
Association football forwards
Argentine Primera División players
Primera Nacional players
Rosario Central footballers
Talleres de Córdoba footballers
Chacarita Juniors footballers
Villa Dálmine footballers
Atlético de Rafaela footballers
Club Atlético Tigre footballers
Sportspeople from Santa Fe Province